Chaetophoraceae is a family of green algae in the order Chaetophorales.

Genera

 Arthrochaete
 Caespitella
 Cedercreutziella
 Chaetomnion
 Chaetonemopsis
 Chaetophora
 Chloroclonium
 Chlorofilum
 Chlorotylium
 Choreoclonium
 Cloniophora
 Coccobotrys
 Crenacantha
 Diaphragma
 Didymosporangium
 Draparnaldia
 Draparnaldioides
 Draparnaldiopsis
 Elaterodiscus
 Endoclonium
 Endophyton
 Entodictyon
 Epibolium
 Fritschiella
 Gloeoplax
 Gongrosira
 Gongrosirella
 Herposteiron
 Hormotila
 Ireksokonia
 Iwanoffia
 Jaagiella
 Klebahniella
 Kymatotrichon
 Leptosiropsis
 Lochmiopsis
 Myxonemopsis
 Nayalia
 Periplegmatium
 Pilinella
 Pleurangium
 Pleurococcus
 Protoderma
 Pseudochaete
 Skvortzoviothrix
 Sporocladopsis
 Stereococcus
 Stigeoclonium
 Streptochlora
 Thamniochloris
 Thamniolum
 Trichodiscus
 Tumulofilum
 Uvulifera
 Zoddaea
 Zygomitus

Formerly included genera

 Trichophilus

References

External links

 
Chlorophyceae families